Utricularia subg. Polypompholyx is a subgenus in the genus Utricularia. Polypompholyx is supported as the sister group to the clade of subgenera Utricularia and Bivalvaria. Within the genus Utricularia, Polypompholyx's sections Polypompholyx, Tridentaria, and Pleiochasia are the most primitive due to their tricolporate pollen type.

See also 
 List of Utricularia species
Utricularia

References

Utricularia
Plant subgenera